
Gmina Krasocin is a rural gmina (administrative district) in Włoszczowa County, Świętokrzyskie Voivodeship, in south-central Poland.

The gmina contains part of the protected area called Przedbórz Landscape Park.

Villages
Gmina Krasocin contains the villages and settlements of Belina, Borowiec, Brygidów, Bukowa, Chałupki, Chotów, Cieśle, Czostków, Dąbrówka, Dąbrówki, Gruszczyn, Huta Stara, Jakubów, Karolinów, Kozia Wieś, Krasocin, Lipia Góra, Lipie, Ludynia, Mieczyn, Niwiska Gruszczyńskie, Niwiska Krasocińskie, Nowy Dwór, Ogrojce, Oleszno, Ostra Górka, Ostrów, Podlesko, Porąbki, Rogalów, Rudnik, Skorków, Stojewsko, Sułków, Świdno, Wielkopole, Wojciechów, Wola Świdzińska, Występy, Zabrody and Żeleźnica.

Neighbouring gminas
Gmina Krasocin is bordered by the gminas of Kluczewsko, Łopuszno, Małogoszcz, Przedbórz, Słupia and Włoszczowa.

References
Polish official population figures 2006

Krasocin
Włoszczowa County